Al Wissam is a designer clothing brand based in Dearborn, Michigan, founded by Bassem Souwaidan, who is known for his art of embroidery. Al Wissam clothing has become popular amongst cultures associated with Urban, Grime/Hip-Hop/Rap Artists and  NFL, NBA, Boxers and various celebrities.

References

External links
 Al Wissam
 Al Wissam at TheCoolList.com
 Al Wissam advert on YouTube

Clothing brands of the United States